The Parcel is a 2020 Indian Bengali-language mystery cum psychological thriller film directed by Indrasis Acharya, produced by Rituparna Sengupta and Krishna Kyal. The film features Rituparna Sengupta, Saswata Chatterjee, Anindya Chatterjee and Ambarish Bhattacharya in lead roles and Sreela Majumdar and Pradip Mukherjee as supporting characters. The story of the film revolves around a doctor-couple and Nandini, the protagonist, and mysterious parcels.

Acharya, the director of the film, won the Best Director award (Hiralal Sen Memorial) at the 25th Kolkata International Film Festival for the film. The film was theatrically released on 13 March 2020.

Plot
The film begins with a couple, Nandini and Souvik, both doctors, and their teenaged daughter leading an uneventful life until it is abruptly disrupted. Nandini receives a parcel one morning from an anonymous person. She feels that someone from her past might be blackmailing her. This leads to an exploration of her psychoses.  The couple fall into a trap that raises questions about their careers, reveals extramarital affairs, and upends regular life as they knew it. Nandini's past haunts her present, creating a major disruption of balance in her narrative.

Cast

 Rituparna Sengupta as Nandini
 Saswata Chatterjee as Souvik
 Anindya Chatterjee
 Ambarish Bhattacharya
 Sreela Majumdar 
 Pradip Mukherjee
 Daminee Basu
 Juin Bagchi

Production 
The film is produced by Rituparna Sengupta and Krishna Kyal.

Promotion and release

The official trailer of the film was unveiled by Acharya on 11 February 2020.

The film was theatrically released on 13 March 2020.

Soundtrack
The music of the film is composed by Joy Sarkar.

Awards

 The Parcel has received two festival laurels – the 14th Jogja NETPAC Asian film festival in Indonesia and the Diorama international film festival in Delhi.
 Indrasis Acharya won the Best Director award (Hiralal Sen Memorial) at the 25th Kolkata International Film Festival for the film The Parcel.

References

External links
 

2019 films
Bengali-language Indian films
2010s Bengali-language films
Indian mystery thriller films
2010s mystery thriller films
Indian psychological thriller films
2019 psychological thriller films